Rudras refer to the forms of the god Rudra, whose traditions have since been associated with Shiva. They make up eleven of the thirty-three gods in the Vedic pantheon. They are at times identified with the storm deities referred to as Maruts, while at other times considered distinct from them.

While the Vamana Purana describes Rudras as the sons of Kashyapa and Aditi, Maruts are described distinct from the Rudras as the 49 sons of Diti, sister of Aditi, and the attendants of Indra, rather than Rudra.

Birth and names
The Ramayana tells they are eleven of the 33 children of the sage Kashyapa and his wife Aditi, along with the 12 Adityas, 8 Vasus and 2 Ashvins, constituting the  Thirty-three gods. The Vamana Purana describes the Rudras as the sons of Kashyapa and Aditi. The Matsya Purana notes that Surabhi – the mother of all cows and the "cow of plenty" – was the consort of Brahma and their union produced the eleven Rudras. Here they are named 

Nirriti
Shambhu
Aparajita 
Mrigavyadha 
Kapardi
Dahana
Khara
Ahirabradhya 
Kapali 
Pingala 
Senani

The Harivamsa, an appendix of the Mahabharata, makes Kashyapa and Surabhi – here, portrayed as his wife – the parents of the Rudras. In another instance in the Mahabharata, it is Dharma (possibly identified with Yama) who is the father of the Rudras and the Maruts.

The Vishnu Purana narrates that Rudra – here identified as Shiva . The furious Rudra was in Ardhanari form, half his body was male and other half female. He divided himself into two: the male and female. The male form then split itself into eleven, forming the eleven Rudras. Some of them were white and gentle; while others were dark and fierce. They are called:

Manyu
Manu 
Mahmasa 
Mahan 
Siva 
Rtudhvaja 
Ugraretas
Bhava 
Kama
Vamadeva
Dhrtavrata

From the woman were born the eleven Rudranis who became wives of the Rudras. They are:
 
Dhi 
Vrtti 
Usana 
Urna 
Niyuta 
Sarpis 
Ila 
Ambika 
Iravatl 
Svadha
Diksa

Brahma allotted to the Rudras the eleven positions of the heart and the five sensory organs, the five organs of action and the mind. Other Puranas call them Aja, Ekapada (Ekapat), Ahirbudhnya, Tvasta, Rudra, Hara, Sambhu, Tryambaka, Aparajita, Isana and Tribhuvana.

In one instance in the epic Mahabharata, the Rudras are eleven in number and are named:

Mrgavadha 
Sarpa 
Nirriti 
Ajaikapad 
Ahi 
Budhnya 
Pinakin 
Dahana 
Ishvara 
Kapali 
Sthanu 
Bhaga

While Kapalin is described the foremost of Rudras here, in the Bhagavad Gita it is Sankara who is considered the greatest of the Rudras. Both Kapalin and Sankara are epithets of Shiva. In another instance, they are described as sons of Tvastr and named:

Vishvarupa 
Ajaikapad  
Ahi Budhnya 
Virupaksa 
Raivata 
Hara 
Bahurupa 
Tryambaka 
Savitra 
Jayanta
Pinakin

While usually the Rudras are described to eleven, in one instance in the Mahabharata; they are said to be eleven thousand and surrounding Shiva, which is another name for Rudra.  The eleven groups of hundred are named:

Ajaikapad  
Ahi Budhnya 
Pinakin 
Rta 
Pitrrupa 
Tryamabaka 
Maheshvara 
Vrsakapi 
Sambhu 
Havana
Ishvara

The Bhagavata Purana Canto 3 Chapter 3 mentions that Rudra is born from the anger of Lord Brahma. The names are mentioned in Canto 3 Chapter 3 and Verse 12 as follows:
 Manyu
 Manu
 Mahinasa
 Mahān
 Śiva
 Ṛtadhvaja
 Ugraretā
 Bhava
 Kāla
 Vāmadeva
 Dhṛtavrata
In Bhagavata Purana Canto 6 Chapter 6 the eleven Rudras are said to be the children of Sarūpā and Bhūta. Sarūpā was a daughter of Daksa. The names of the eleven Rudras given in Canto 6 Chapter 6 Verse 17-18 are:
 Raivata
 Aja
 Bhava
 Bhīma
 Vāma
 Ugra
 Vṛṣākapi
 Ajaikapāt
 Ahirbradhna
 Bahurūpa
 Mahān
The Matsya Purana mentions the ferocious eleven Rudras – named:

Kapali 
Pingala 
Bhima 
Virupaksa 
Vilohita 
Ajapada
Ahirabradhya 
Shasta 
Shambhu 
Chanda 
Bhava

Aiding God Vishnu in his fight against the demons. They wear lion-skins, matted-hair and serpents around their necks. They have yellow throats, hold tridents and skulls and have the crescent moon on their foreheads. Together headed by Kapali, they slay the elephant demon Gajasura.

Associations
In Vedic scriptures, Rudras are described as loyal companions of Rudra, who later was identified with Shiva. They are considered as divine aids , messengers and forms of Rudra. They are fearful in nature. The Satapatha Brahmana mentions that Rudra is the prince, while Rudras are his subjects. They are considered as attendants of Shiva in later mythology.

The Rig Veda and the Krishna Yajur Veda makes the Rudras the gods of the middle world, situated between earth and heaven i.e. the atmosphere. As wind-gods, the Rudras represent the life-breath. In the Brihadaranyaka Upanishad, the eleven Rudras are represented by ten vital energies (rudra-prana) in the body and the eleventh one being the Ātman (the soul).

The Rudras are said to preside over the second stage of creation and the intermediary stage of life. They govern the second ritual of sacrifice, the mid-day offering and the second stage of life – from the 24th to the 68 year of life. The Chandogya Upanishad prescribes that the Rudras be propitiated in case of sickness in this period and further says that they on departing the body become the cause of tears, the meaning of the name Rudra being the "ones who make cry". The Brihadaranyaka Upanishad explicitly states the fact that since the Rudras leaving the body – causing death – makes people cry, they are Rudras.

The Mahabharata describes the Rudras as companions of Indra, servants of Shiva and his son Skanda and companions of Yama, who is surrounded by them. They have immense power, wear golden necklaces and are "like lighting-illuminated clouds". The Bhagavata Purana prescribes the worship of the Rudras to gain virile power.

Association with Maruts

Rudras are at times identified with the Maruts – sons of Rudra in the Vedas; while at other times, considered distinct from them.

Some scholars believe that Rudras and Maruts could be distinct groups, Rudras being the true followers of Rudra and daivic (Godly) in nature. But poets of the Rigveda declared the Maruts to take the position of the Rudras in order to give status to the Vedic god Rudra. Later in post-Vedic literature like the epics and Puranas, Maruts were associated with Indra, while Rudras gained their former status as followers of Rudra, who had evolved into Shiva. However, other scholars disregard this theory and consider that originally Rudras and Maruts were identical. A theory suggests that slowly in the Vedas two classes of Maruts came into existence: the friendly and beneficent, and the roaring and turbulent; the latter grew into the distinct group of deities called the Rudras, who were associated only with the wild Rudra.

In the Marut Suktas (RV 1, 2, 5, 8) and Indra-Suktas (RV 1, 3, 8, 10) of the Rigveda (RV), the epithet "Rudras" – originating from the verb root rud or ru and meaning howlers, roarers or shouters – is used numerous times for the Maruts – identifying them with the Rudras even when associated with Indra, rather than Rudra. There are some hymns in the Rigveda (RV 2, 7, 8, 10) that explicitly distinguish between the Maruts and the Rudras.

While the Vamana Purana describes Rudras as the sons of Kashyapa and Aditi, Maruts are described distinct from the Rudras as 49 sons of Diti, sister of Aditi and attendants of Indra.

Ashwatthama

Ashwatthama, the son of Drona, is the avatar of one of the eleven Rudras, along with being one of the eight Chiranjivi (the immortals). Drona performed many years of severe penances to please Lord Shiva in order to obtain a son who possessed the same valiance as the latter. Ashwatthama, the powerful son of Drona, though known as the part incarnate of Rudra, was really born of the four parts of Yama (death), Rudra (destruction), Kama (love) and Krodha (anger). Just before Mahabharata war, Bhishma himself declared that it would be virtually impossible for anyone to kill or defeat Ashwatthama in battle as he was the part incarnate of Rudra. Bhishma stated that when Ashwatthama becomes angry, it would become impossible to fight him as he would become "a second Shiva". The dishonoured death of Drona left Aswathama infuriated, and this event led directly to the annihilation of most of the Pandava lineage by the hands of Ashwatthama himself.

See also
Thirty-three gods
Aditya
Vasus
Ashvins
Indra
Prajapati
Maruts

Notes

References

Forms of Shiva
Hindu gods
Rigvedic deities